Gambierdiscus ruetzleri is a species of toxic dinoflagellates, which among others causes ciguatera fish poisoning. It is photosynthetic and epibenthic.

References

Further reading
Rhodes, L., et al. "Gambierdiscus cf. yasumotoi (Dinophyceae) isolated from New Zealand's sub-tropical northern coastal waters." New Zealand Journal of Marine and Freshwater Research 48.2 (2014): 303-310.
Nishimura, Tomohiro, et al. "Genetic diversity and distribution of the ciguatera-causing dinoflagellate Gambierdiscus spp.(Dinophyceae) in coastal areas of Japan." PLoS ONE 8.4 (2013): e60882.

External links

AlgaeBase

Gonyaulacales
Protists described in 2009